George William Warwick (May 1, 1890 – September 28, 1964) was a Canadian professional ice hockey player. He played with the Montreal Wanderers of the National Hockey Association during the 1913–14 NHA season.

Warwick played with McGill University in 1911–12 and in Hartford, Connecticut in 1912–13.

References

Notes

1890 births
1964 deaths
Montreal Wanderers (NHA) players
People from Brockville
Canadian ice hockey goaltenders